Oissel is a commune in the Seine-Maritime department in the Normandy region in northern France.

Geography
Junction 22 of the A13 autoroute is entirely within the commune's borders. SNCF operates a TER rail service here.

History
The area around Oissel were a common place for Viking raiders because of its location on the Seine river, during their raids on Francia. Eventually, the Vikings setteled on one of the islands near Oissel and made it into a base, calling the island "Thorhólmr" meaning "Thor's Island".

During the battle of France, 9 June 1940, the French blew up several bridges and crossings over the Seine river around Oissel to halt the German advance, including Viaduc de Oissel and Pont de Tourville-la-Rivière.

Heraldry

Population

People
 Daniel Horlaville, footballer born in 1945.
 Raoul Grimoin-Sanson (1860–1941), cinematographic inventor.
 Grégory Tafforeau, footballer born in 1976.
 Thierry Foucaud, 1954-, Politician.

Places of interest
 The church of St.Martin, dating from the nineteenth century.
 The sixteenth century manorhouse, the Manoir de La Chapelle.
 The Dambray Pavillon, from the seventeenth century.
 The Château de La Perreuse.

See also
Communes of the Seine-Maritime department

References

External links

Oissel official website 
Pictures of Oissel, the photoblog of an osselien.

Communes of Seine-Maritime